Imre Ráday (4 September 1905 – 12 March 1983) was a Hungarian film actor.

Ráday was born in Budapest, then part of Austria-Hungary and died in Budapest, Hungary in 1983.

Selected filmography
 The Trial of Donald Westhof (1927)
 The Woman in the Cupboard (1927)
 At the Edge of the World (1927)
 The Csardas Princess (1927)
 Strauss Is Playing Today (1928)
 Frauenarzt Dr. Schäfer (1928)
 The Dream Car (1934)
 Peter (1934)
 Márciusi mese (1934)
 Pókháló (1936)
 The Lady Is a Bit Cracked (1938)
 Dollárpapa (1956)
 Guns and Doves (1961)
 Alba Regia (1961)
 The Lost Generation (1968)
 The Girl Who Liked Purple Flowers (1973)
 Mrs. Dery Where Are You? (1975)
 The Phantom on Horseback (1976)

Bibliography
 Jung, Uli & Schatzberg, Walter. Beyond Caligari: The Films of Robert Wiene. Berghahn Books, 1999.

External links

1905 births
1983 deaths
Hungarian male film actors
Hungarian male silent film actors
Male actors from Budapest
20th-century Hungarian male actors